Philip Payne is a former professional rugby league footballer who played in the 1980s.

References

External links
Stanley Rangers ARLFC - Roll of Honour
Phil Payne Memory Box Search at archive.castigersheritage.com

Castleford Tigers players
Living people
English rugby league players
Place of birth missing (living people)
Rugby league centres
Year of birth missing (living people)